Charles Henry Ludington (February 1, 1825 – January 1, 1910) was a nineteenth-century American merchant in the dry goods business.

Early life and education
Charles Henry Ludington, son of Lewis Ludington and his wife Polly (Townsend) Ludington was born in Carmel, New York on February 1, 1825.  He attended the Carmel Academy school as a child and had further education at the Ridgefield, Connecticut School District.

Ludington initially worked in New York as a clerk in a wholesale dry goods firm called Woodward, Otis & Terbell, and later at Johnes, Otis & Company.

Mid life and business career 
Ludington in 1849 became a partner in a dry goods firm later named Lathrop, Ludington, and Company. The importing and wholesale business was first located on Cortlandt Street in Manhattan and eight years later moved to a larger store on Park Row in Park Place in Brooklyn, New York. The firm had business in all parts of the United States north of the Mason-Dixon line and had a good reputation in the field.

Personal life 
Ludington retired from Lathrop, Ludington, and Company in 1868. He had been on the board of directors for many corporations and public institutions. He had been a director of Washington Life Insurance Company and American Surety Company. Ludington was a member of the Union League social club and the Century Association social club. He was also an active member of three art associations.

Legacy
In Old Lyme, Connecticut, the Phoebe Griffin Noyes Library was built in 1898 as a memorial to Ludington's mother-in-law.

References

Sources

1825 births
1910 deaths
People from New York (state)
People from Connecticut
Ludington family